Mu'iz ad-Dinis the name of:

Mu'izzuddīn Muḥammad Ibn Sām, known as Shahabuddin Muhammad Ghori (1149–1206), Sultan of the Ghorid dynasty (Afghanistan)
Mu'izz ad-Din Mahmud (died 1241), Zengid Emir of Jazira
Muiz ud din Bahram (died 1242), Muslim Turkic ruler, Sultan of Delhi
Muiz ud din Qaiqabad (1286–1290), Muslim Turkic ruler, Sultan of Delhi
Muhammad Mu'iz ud-din (died 1779), sultan of the Maldives
Chowdhury Moyezuddin Biwshash (fl. c. 1886), powerful Muslim landlord (zamindar) in Bengal
Sálim Moizuddin Abdul Ali, or Salim Ali (1896–1987), Indian ornithologist and naturalist
Hassanal Bolkiah Mu'izzaddin Waddaulah (born 1946), Sultan and Yang Di-Pertuan of Brunei

Arabic masculine given names